Dashnor Dume (born 17 September 1963) is an Albanian former footballer and coach.

Club career
Dume played most of his club career in Albania representing hometown club Naftëtari Qyteti Stalin as well as local rivals Tomori Berat and Bylis Ballsh, and also had a brief spell in Romania with Oțelul Galați alongside compatriot Altin Masati.

Dume was part of Bylis Ballsh's golden days, helped the club reach Europe for the first time in their history, and they were tied against Slovakian side FK Senica, whom they lost to 5–1 on aggregate, with Dume captaining  the team in both games.

International career
Dume is also a former Albania international, playing two matches. He made his international debut on 30 March 1991 in the 5–0 away defeat at France for the UEFA Euro 1992 qualifying.

International statistics

Coaching career
After his retirement, Dume took care of Bylis Ballsh as a coach for only one match. In 2012/13 he was technical director at Naftëtari Kuçovë.

References

External links

1963 births
Living people
Footballers from Tirana
Albanian footballers
Association football defenders
Albania international footballers
KF Naftëtari Kuçovë players
FK Tomori Berat players
ASC Oțelul Galați players
KF Bylis Ballsh players
Kategoria Superiore players
Liga I players
Albanian expatriate footballers
Albanian expatriate sportspeople in Romania
Expatriate footballers in Romania
Albanian football managers
KF Bylis Ballsh managers
Naftëtari Kuçovë managers